The Bale Oak was a large oak tree in Bale, a village in northern Norfolk, England that was over 500 years old when it was felled in 1860.

History
In the middle of the 14th century, All Saints church was erected immediately east of the site of the tree. According to folk legend, the tree had previously been a site for pre-Christian worship and may have been a part of a larger grove.

In 1795, the oak was severely damaged. The oak was heavily pollarded and the removed bark and some of the wood was sold to the Hardys of Letheringsett for tanning.

Norfolk historian Rev. Blomfield recorded use of the oak in the 18th century:
A great oak at bathele near the church, its hollow so large that ten or twelve men may stand within it and a cobbler had his shop and lodge there of late and it is or was used for a swinestry.

Deemed dangerous by the local populace, the abuse of the tree lead to its destruction in 1860. The Lord of the Manor Sir Willoughby Jones ordered the tree removed and, with much local mourning, the remains taken carted to Cranmer Hall at Fakenham.

The site is now covered by a grove of Holm oaks and is protected by the National Trust for Places of Historic Interest or Natural Beauty.

Further sources
 Leaflet: Joyce E. Stone. 1966. As big as Bale Oak..
 Newspaper Article: Eastern Daily Press. 2015. Riddle of two skeletons found by builders in a former village pub. 8 December.
 Monograph: Bryant, T. H. 1902. Hundred of Holt. The Churches of Norfolk. Vol IX. p 2.

References

External links
Norfolkchurches.co.uk's site on All Saints, the church built next to the oak, including various photographs of the site where the oak stood.
Glavenvalley.co.uk's tourist site regarding Bale (the village) with a small blurb and photograph of the site of the oak.
Norfolk Coast & Countryside's article regarding the history of the tree.

Individual oak trees
Objects of historical interest in Norfolk
1860s individual tree deaths
Individual trees in England
Destroyed individual trees